Timothy Otis Howe (February 24, 1816March 25, 1883) was a member of the United States Senate for three terms, representing the state of Wisconsin from March 4, 1861, to March 3, 1879. He also served as U.S. Postmaster General under President Chester A. Arthur from 1881 until his death in 1883. Earlier in his career, he was a justice of the Wisconsin Supreme Court.

Biography
Howe was born in Livermore, Maine (then, part of the commonwealth of Massachusetts), to Timothy Howe and Betsey Howard, attended Readfield Seminary now Kents Hill School, in Readfield, Maine, and studied law with local judges. In 1839, Howe was admitted to the Maine Bar and began practicing law in Readfield. In 1845, he was elected to the Maine House of Representatives. Shortly thereafter, Howe moved to Green Bay, Wisconsin, and opened a law office. He was an ardent Whig and ran an unsuccessful campaign for U.S. Congress in 1848.

Howe married Linda Ann Haines and together the couple had 2 children, Mary E. Howe and Frank K. Howe.

Howe was elected circuit judge in Wisconsin and served in that position from 1851 to 1855.  As a circuit judge, he also served as a justice of the Wisconsin Supreme Court until a separate Supreme Court was organized in 1853.

In 1857, Howe ran unsuccessfully for the U.S. Senate. In 1861, Howe ran again and won election to the Senate, serving during the American Civil War and Reconstruction.  During his time in the Senate, he was an abolitionist and supporter of the Fifteenth Amendment. Howe argued against the claims of contemporary Democrats that blacks were inherently racially inferior, and remarked that their claim that abolition would cause a war of racial extermination was "a libel upon humanity, black or white."  During this time he was considered one of the "Radical Republicans" due to his support for racial equality and his opposition to discrimination.

1865 Congressional Hearings chaired by Senator Doolittle looked into Sioux Complaints from the Yankton and Dakota tribes.  The Senator found: "Many agents, teachers, and employees of the government, are inefficient, faithless, and even guilty of peculations are fraudulent practices upon the government and upon the Indians."  Yankton Chief Medicine Cow testified that Government Agents were the cause of the Minnesota problems.  What those agents did in Minnesota was a harbinger of the history coming for the other tribes of the plains.

While in the Senate, President Ulysses S. Grant offered Howe the position of Chief Justice of the U.S. Supreme Court. However, Howe declined the offer because he feared his successor to the Senate would be a Democrat. Howe lost his senate seat in 1879 to fellow Republican Matthew H. Carpenter. In 1881, he was appointed United States Postmaster General by President Chester A. Arthur, a position he held until his death in Kenosha, Wisconsin, on March 25, 1883.

Electoral history

U.S. House of Representatives (1848)

| colspan="6" style="text-align:center;background-color: #e9e9e9;"| General Election, November 7, 1848

Wisconsin Lieutenant Governor (1849)

| colspan="6" style="text-align:center;background-color: #e9e9e9;"| General Election, November 6, 1849

Sources consulted
Wisconsin Supreme Court biographical sketch

Footnotes

Further reading

 William H. Russell, "Timothy O. Howe, Stalwart Republican," Wisconsin Magazine of History, vol. 35, no. 2 (Winter 1951), pp. 90–99. In JSTOR

1816 births
1883 deaths
Politicians from Green Bay, Wisconsin
People from Livermore, Maine
United States Postmasters General
Members of the Maine House of Representatives
Wisconsin state court judges
People of Wisconsin in the American Civil War
Justices of the Wisconsin Supreme Court
Wisconsin Republicans
Wisconsin Whigs
Republican Party United States senators from Wisconsin
Arthur administration cabinet members
Maine Whigs
19th-century American politicians
People from Readfield, Maine
Kents Hill School alumni
19th-century American judges